Selwyn is a given name and surname. 

It may have originated from the Middle English personal name, Selewyne and from the Old English personal name Seleƿine, putting together the words sele ("hall") and ƿine ("friend") or "sea friend". Other research indicates a French origin, from Salvagin, meaning "wild person", introduced during the Norman Conquest, and may well have been used as a joke, meaning someone who was the opposite of wild. It may have come from the Latin Silvanus or Salvin, a Roman clan name connected to the God of the Forest.

Middle names 
 John Selwyn Moll (1913–1942), English rugby player

Surnames 
 Alfred Richard Cecil Selwyn (1824–1902), British geologist who surveyed parts of Australia and Canada
 Archibald Selwyn (1877–1959), American theatrical producer
 Charles Jasper Selwyn (1813–1869), Judge, Lord Justice, M.P. and privy counsellor
 Charles William Selwyn (1858–1893), British army officer and Conservative politician
 Don Selwyn (c. 1936–2007), Maori actor and film director from New Zealand
 Edgar Selwyn (1875–1944), American film director and theatrical producer
 George Augustus Selwyn (1809–1878), Bishop of New Zealand and Lichfield
 George Augustus Selwyn (politician) (1719–1791), English politician and wit
 George Selwyn (bishop of Tinnevelly) (1887–1957), Missionary bishop in South India
 Sir Percy Selwyn Selwyn-Clarke (1893–1976), Director of Medical Services, Hong Kong, 1937–43, and Governor of the Seychelles, 1947–51
 John Richardson Selwyn (1844–1898), Second bishop of Melanesia
 Sydney Selwyn  (1934–1996), British physician, medical scientist and notable expert in the history of medicine.
 Tim Selwyn (born 1974), New Zealand political activist who was tried for sedition
 Victor Selwyn (1917–2005), British journalist
 William Selwyn (1655–1702), officer in the British Army, MP and briefly Governor of Jamaica
 William Marshall Selwyn (1879–1951), Bishop of Fulham, Archdeacon of Bath and Rector of Bath Abbey
 Zachariah Selwyn (born 1975), American TV personality

Given names 
 Selwyn Baker (1911–1996), Australian rules footballer
 Selwyn Baptiste (1936–2012), Trinidadian-British musician
 Selwyn Bean (1886–1981), Archdeacon of Manchester, 1934–66
 Selwyn Biggs (1872–1943), Welsh rugby union player
 Selwyn Birchwood (born 1985), American blues guitarist
 Selwyn Blackmore (born 1972), New Zealand cricketer
 Selwyn G. Blaylock (1879–1945), Canadian businessman
 Selwyn Z. Bowman (1840–1928), U.S. Representative from Massachusetts
 Selwyn Brown (musician) (born 1958), British musician
 Selwyn Closs-Parry (1925–2015), Archdeacon of St Asaph, 1984–90
 Selwyn Cudjoe (born 1943), Trinidadian academic and historian
 Selwyn Dewdney (1909–1979), Canadian author, illustrator, artist and activist
 Selwyn Edge (1868–1940), Australian businessman and racing car driver
 Selwyn Fernandes (born 1980), Indian footballer
 Selwyn Fremantle (1869–1942), British administrator in India
 Selwyn Froggitt  main character in British sitcom Oh No, It's Selwyn Froggitt!
 Selwyn Griffith (1928–2011), Welsh poet
 Selwyn Hughes (1928–2006), British Christian minister
 Selwyn Image (1849–1930), British academic
 Selwyn Jepson (1899–1989), British author
 Selwyn Jones (born 1970), American football player
 Selwyn George (Bill) Lane (1922–2000), Australian ornithologist
 Selwyn Lloyd (1904–1978), British Conservative politician
 Selwyn Lymon (born 1986), American football wide receiver
 Selwyn Maister (born 1946), New Zealand field hockey player
 Selwyn N. Owen (1836–1916), American jurist
 Selwyn Porter (1905–1963), Australian Army officer
 Selwyn Raab (born 1934), American author and journalist
 Selwyn Richardson (1935–1995), Trinidadian lawyer
 Selwyn Riumana (born 1966), Solomon Islander politician
 Selwyn (singer) (born Selwyn Pretorius, 1982), Australian R&B singer of South African origin
 Selwyn Selwyn-Clarke (1893–1976), British doctor and barrister
 Selwyn Sese Ala (1986–2015), Vanuatuan footballer
 Selwyn Toogood (1916–2001), New Zealand television personality
 Selwyn Ward (born 1977), American actor
 Selwyn Whalley (1934–2008), English footballer
 Selwyn Walford Young (1899–1977), Belizean musician and composer
 Selwyn Wright (1934–2015), British physicist and engineer

References

Surnames of Old English origin